The 8251 is a Universal Synchronous/Asynchronous Receiver/Transmitter (USART) packaged in a 28-pin DIP made by Intel.

It is commonly confused with the much more common 8250 UART that was made popular as the serial port in the IBM Personal Computer.

It includes 5 sections:
 read/write control logic
 transmitter
 receiver
 data bus system
 modem control

Variants

Known uses 

The Intel 8251A was used in the Intel SDK-86 MCS-86 System Design Kit
and the DEC LA120 printing terminal.
The device is also used in the IC-10 RS-232 interface for Kenwood HAM radios like TS-440S, TS-711, TS-811 and many others.

External links and references 
 Mikrocomputer Bausteine, Datenbuch 1979/80, Band 3, Peripherie, Siemens AG, Bestellnummer B 2049, pp. 64–101.
 NEC Electronics (Europe) GmbH, 1982 Catalog, pp. 631–648

Intel chipsets
IBM PC compatibles
Input/output integrated circuits